Egg Mania: Eggstreme Madness, also known as Eggo Mania in PAL territories, is a puzzle video game released in 2002 by HotGen.

Gameplay
At the start of a level, crates begin falling from the sky. Each one has a picture of the block it contains on it. Stack these blocks and build a tower up to the hot-air-balloon to finish the level. However, it is not that simple; the water at the bottom of the level rises and if the water reaches a row with a hole in it, the row will be destroyed; if the player decides to take a shortcut, the water will rise faster. Also, several enemies randomly appear, some stealing your crates, and some dragging you into the water. There are also items in bubbles that give you a power-up or help to destroy an opponent's towers.

Reception

The game was met with positive to very mixed reception.  GameRankings and Metacritic gave it a score of 73% and 75 out of 100 for the Game Boy Advance version; 68.33% and 64 out of 100 for the PlayStation 2 version; 66.18% and 64 out of 100 for the GameCube version; and 64.77% and 58 out of 100 for the Xbox version.

References

External links

2002 video games
Game Boy Advance games
GameCube games
HotGen games
Kemco games
Multiplayer and single-player video games
PlayStation 2 games
Puzzle video games
Video games developed in the United Kingdom
Video games scored by Allister Brimble
Xbox games